The 2020–21 Florida Panthers season was the 28th season for the National Hockey League franchise that was established in 1993. Head coach Joel Quenneville coached his second season with the team. On December 20, 2020, the league temporarily realigned into four divisions with no conferences due to the COVID-19 pandemic and the ongoing closure of the Canada–United States border. As a result of this realignment, the Panthers would play this season in the Central Division and would only play games against the other teams in their new division during the regular season, and potentially, the first two rounds of the playoffs.

On April 27, the Panthers clinched a playoff berth after a 7–4 win over the Nashville Predators. In the first round, they met their rivals the Tampa Bay Lightning in the playoffs for the first time. They were eliminated with a 4-0 loss in game six on May 26, continuing the league's longest playoff series win drought.

Standings

Schedule and results

Regular season
The regular season schedule was published on December 23, 2020.

Playoffs

Draft picks

Below are the Florida Panthers selection at the 2020 NHL Draft which was held on October 6–7 at NHL Network Studios.

Notes

References

Florida Panthers
Florida Panthers seasons
Florida Panthers
Florida Panthers